Nothing But Trouble is a 1944 Laurel and Hardy feature film released by Metro-Goldwyn-Mayer and directed by Sam Taylor

Plot

Stan Laurel and Oliver Hardy return to America after fourteen years of voluntary exile to find jobs. Ollie has worked as a mediocre cook and Stan has served as a butler for many years. Upon their return they find that there are just as many people looking for servants now, because of the war's workforce shortage, as there were unemployed in 1932, because of the Depression.

Both men get hired by a wealthy woman named Elvira Hawkley, who is in desperate need of help to prepare for a big formal dinner she is hosting in the evening. The guest of honour at the dinner is none other than the young exiled King Christopher of Orlandia.

Before the dinner, Christopher tells his guardian, Prince Saul, that he wants to know more about the life of the common man in America. His biggest dream is to play American football for Notre Dame.  Saul arranges for Ronetz, his Assistant, to take the young King for a walk, so that an 'accident' can happen to him. Christopher is unaware that Saul is planning to murder him and take over the throne.

When Christopher and Ronetz reach the park, Ronetz excuses himself to make way for the two assassins he has hired to kill the king. Christopher happens to hear a football game nearby, and whilst there sees one of the players sent home by his mother. Christopher offers to take the missing player's place, but it turns out the game's referee has also quit. Stan and Ollie happen to pass by the game with groceries they have bought for the evening dinner, and Christopher persuades them to be referees in the game.

Christopher has never played football before, and his first contact with the ball is not so successful, as he fumbles and drops the ball. With the help of the incompetent referees, Christopher picks up his game and actually manage to score a touchdown that wins the match, partly because the other team's boys bounce off Ollie's body as he runs alongside, refereeing. Christopher is overjoyed with his own performance, and thankful again to the very helpful referees.

Ollie and Stan discover that they have forgotten to buy the dinner's steak, and can't buy one now, as they have spent all the money they were given by Elvira; they blame each other. They see a lion at the nearby zoo being fed a big steak, and decide to try and steal it for the dinner. Christopher is not aware that Stan and Ollie are working where Saul is to be the guest. While Stan and Ollie argue about who will actually take the steak from the lion, equally afraid of being eaten themselves, Christopher steps in and snatches the steak away from the lion, which has been distracted by Stans being so afraid that he's jumped up on top of a wall.

The three soon arrive at Elvira's building, and although Christopher asks to stay, because he says his Uncle beats him, Stan and Ollie are reluctantly forced to say no because they have to attend to the function; but Christopher sneaks in. Discovering him, they allow him to stay. Soon, Christopher discovers the incompetence of the two servants and tries to teach Stan the proper etiquette in a rehearsal for the formal dinner. He fails in his mission, and instead offers to help by hiding under the dinner table and to give instructions to Stan from there during the dinner, by using his hand to tap on Stan's foot.

But it turns out that the steak is made of horse meat, and however they try to cut it, they can't; not even with a two-man saw!

Saul explains that Christopher is missing at the dinner because of illness, but is soon made aware by Ronetz that he is in fact not dead, but missing. Saul excuses himself and leaves the practically inedible dinner. Elvira goes into the kitchen and fires Stan and Ollie on the spot because of their poor performance. She discovers Christopher in the kitchen, but doesn't know he's the king. She throws all three out, and they take their refuge at a mission. A tramp there recognizes Christopher from a picture in the papers, and alerts the police, thinking that he's been kidnapped by Stan and Ollie.

The police arrive, and arrest them; but later, Christopher demands they be hired as his help, and the charges are dropped. Saul sees an opportunity to use the two dimwits as pawns in order to kill Christopher. Ronetz puts poison in the salad Ollie tells him is reserved for Christopher, as it's the largest. But Stan and Ollie disagree about which one the largest is, and the plates are then mixed-up on the tray, so there's then no telling who's got the poisoned one.

An argument ensues between Saul and Ronetz because of the mixup and Christopher overhears them, finding out about the attempt to kill him. Christopher goes to tell Ollie and Stan, Saul follows, and pulls a gun on the three in the kitchen, and forces them out onto the skyscraper's ledge, trying to make them jump and take their own lives.

Ollie notices the hanging boards being used by the painters below, which Christopher uses. Before Ollie and Stan dare to jump after him, the boards are pulled back, but Stan and Ollie are left hanging after falling, with Stan dangling high up above the street, hanging onto Ollie's trousers. Christopher manages to get down to the street and fetch the police, who arrive just in time to rescue them.

Before Saul had managed to count to ten, at which time the Stan and Ollie were to jump, or to be shot, he'd eaten the poison Ollie had innocently removed from the poisoned salad, had placed on a titbit, and had stopped counting: at number 9; he's carried out on a stretcher from the apartment.

The story ends happily with Christopher, Oliver and Stan singing the Notre Dame victory march, together with the two policemen.

Trailer Discrepancies
Interestingly, the Trailer shows either different moments of Stan dancing at the end, or, a different take. 
Further, a different take in the Trailer appears at the zoo, where Stan is heard asking Ollie if the Lion has read " 'That' book'" they're discussing; but in the film the question was " 'The' "Book".

Cast

 Stan Laurel - Stanley
 Oliver Hardy - Oliver
 Mary Boland - Mrs. Hawkley 
 Philip Merivale - Prince Saul 
 Henry O'Neill - Mr. Hawkley 
 David Leland - King Christopher 
 John Warburton - Ronetz 
 Matthew Boulton - Prince Prentiloff 
 Connie Gilchrist - Mrs. Flannigan 
 John Berkes - Jones (uncredited) 
 Tom Brannigan - Willis
 Cliff Clark - Police Sergeant
 Chester Clute - Clerk in 1944
 Garry Owen - Clerk in 1932
 Gino Corrado - Mr. Kitteridge
 Frank Darien - Old Man
 Steve Darrell - Zoo Attendant 
 Jean De Briac - French Restaurateur
 Joan Delmer - Timekeeper
 Robert Dudley - bit role
 Eddie Dunn - Policeman in Flop House
 Edward Earle - bit role
 William Frambes - Ocean Liner Passenger
 Rita Gould- bit role
 Grayce Hampton - Mrs. Herkheimer
 Dell Henderson - Painter
 Leyland Hodgson - Felcon
 William J. Holmes - Royal Courtier
 Robert Homans - Jailer
 Olin Howland - Painter's Foreman
 Charles Irwin - Karel
 Edward Keane - Police Chief Smith
 Nolan Leary - Painter
 Jack Lindquist - Kid
 Roger McGee - Referee
 Howard M. Mitchell - Zoo Attendant
 Forbes Murray - Police Official
 Mayo Newhall - Royal Courtier
 Toby Noolan - Royal Courtier
 Robert Emmett O'Connor - Police Officer Mulligan
 Lee Phelps - Rankin's Friend
 Paul Porcasi - Italian Restaurateur
 Tom Quinn - bit role 
 Bob Stebbins - Chuck
 Ray Teal - Police Officer
 John Valentine - Attache
 John Vosper - Attendant
 Robert Winkler - Busby 
 Joe Yule - Police Officer

Production notes
During the late 1930s and 1940s, great silent screen comedian Buster Keaton, and a close friend of Stan Laurel, worked as a gagman at Metro-Goldwyn-Mayer and helped supply gags for Nothing but Trouble. At Stan Laurel's funeral in 1965, Keaton said that he believed Laurel to a greater comedian than Charlie Chaplin.

Nothing but Trouble was completed in August 1944 but stayed on the shelf for seven months; the studio was rushing all of its military-themed productions into release first. When Nothing but Trouble was finally released in March 1945, it became a surprise hit internationally as moviegoers, waiting anxiously for the war to end, flocked to the Laurel & Hardy show as an escapist comedy. It was Laurel & Hardy's all-time biggest boxoffice success, earning $1,500,000 in ticket sales.

Jack Lindquist, as 'The Kid', eventually became President of Disneyland, between 1990-'93.

References

External links 

 
 
 
 
 

1944 films
1944 comedy films
Laurel and Hardy (film series)
Films directed by Sam Taylor
Metro-Goldwyn-Mayer films
Films scored by Nathaniel Shilkret
Films produced by B. F. Zeidman
American black-and-white films
1940s English-language films
1940s American films